Brueghel or Bruegel was the name of several Dutch/Flemish painters from the Brueghel family:

 Pieter Bruegel the Elder (c. 1525–1569), the most famous member of the family and the only one to sign his paintings as "Bruegel" without the H
 Pieter Brueghel the Younger (1564–1638)
 Jan Brueghel the Elder (1568–1625)
 Jan Brueghel the Younger (1601–1678)
 Ambrosius Brueghel (1617–1675)
 Jan Pieter Brueghel (1628–1664)
 Abraham Brueghel (1631–1690)
 Jan Baptist Brueghel (1647–1719)

Bruegel may also refer to:
 9664 Brueghel, outer main-belt asteroid
 Bruegel (crater), on Mercury
 Breugel, Netherlands, a village in the municipality of Son en Breugel
 Bruegel (think tank), European economic think tank with offices in Brussels

Others
 Brueghel's syndrome